Hurd & Fitzgerald Building, also known as the Hurd Sales Company, is a historic factory building located at Utica in Oneida County, New York. It was built in 1911 and is a five-story, rectangular brick building built for a shoe and rubber goods manufacturer.

It was a work of Utica architect Frederick H. Gouge.

It was listed on the National Register of Historic Places in 1993.

References

Buildings and structures in Utica, New York
Industrial buildings and structures on the National Register of Historic Places in New York (state)
Industrial buildings completed in 1911
1911 establishments in New York (state)
National Register of Historic Places in Oneida County, New York